The Hatfield–McCoy feud, also described by journalists as the Hatfield–McCoy conflict, involved two rural American families of the West Virginia–Kentucky area along the Tug Fork of the Big Sandy River in the years 1863–1891. The Hatfields of West Virginia were led by William Anderson "Devil Anse" Hatfield, while the McCoys of Kentucky were under the leadership of Randolph "Ole Ran'l" McCoy. Those involved in the feud were descended from Joseph Hatfield and William McCoy (born  1750). The feud has entered the American folklore lexicon as a metonym for any bitterly feuding rival parties. 

The McCoy family lived primarily on the Kentucky side of the Tug Fork; the Hatfields lived mostly on the West Virginia side. The majority of the Hatfields, although living in Mingo County (then part of Logan County), fought for the Confederacy in the American Civil War; most McCoys also fought for the Confederates, with the exception of Asa Harmon McCoy, who fought for the Union. The first real violence in the feud was the death of Asa as he returned from the war, murdered by a group of Confederate Home Guards called the Logan Wildcats. Devil Anse Hatfield was a suspect at first, but was later confirmed to have been sick at home at the time of the murder. It was widely believed that his uncle, Jim Vance, a member of the Wildcats, committed the murder.

The Hatfields were more affluent than the McCoys and had many more political connections. Anse's timbering operation was a source of wealth for his family, while the McCoys were more of a lower-middle-class family. Ole Ran'l owned a  farm. Both families had also been involved in the manufacturing and selling of illegal moonshine, a popular commodity at the time.

Feud

Civil War

Asa Harmon McCoy joined the 45th Kentucky Infantry on October 20, 1863. According to his Compiled Service Records, he was "captured by Rebels" on December 5, 1863, and was released four months later to a Union hospital in Maryland. At the time of his capture, he was recovering from a gunshot wound to the chest. During the early months of the Civil War, Asa joined a company of the Pike County Home Guards, under the command of Uriah Runyon, and it is thought he sustained the wound while serving in this unit. William Francis also led a company of Pike County Guards during 1862, a group of which attacked and shot Mose Christian Cline, a friend of Devil Anse Hatfield. Although Cline survived his wounds, Anse vowed to retaliate against the responsible parties. Some time in 1863, a group of Confederate Home Guards ambushed and killed Francis as he was leaving his house, and Anse took credit for the deed. Runyon later joined the 39th Kentucky Infantry and was killed on May 7, 1864, in Pike County, Kentucky. His Compiled Service Records say "Killed by Rebels". 

On muster rolls beginning on May 6, 1864, Asa is reported in a Lexington hospital, suffering from a leg fracture. Beginning in December 1864, the 45th Kentucky Infantry began mustering its companies out of service. Asa's Company E was mustered out on December 24, 1864, in Ashland. He was killed near his home on January 7, 1865, just thirteen days after leaving the Union Army. A group of Confederate guerrillas took credit for the killing and his wife's pension application states that he was "killed by Rebels". There are no existing records pertaining to his death and no warrants were issued in connection with the murder. McCoy family tradition points to James "Jim" Vance, an uncle of Anse and a member of a West Virginia militia group, as the culprit.

Escalation
The second recorded instance of violence in the feud occurred thirteen years later, in 1878, after a dispute about the ownership of a hog: Floyd Hatfield, a cousin of Anse's, owned the hog, but Randolph McCoy claimed it was his, saying that the notches on the pig's ears were McCoy, not Hatfield, marks. The matter was taken to the local Justice of the Peace, Anderson "Preacher Anse" Hatfield, who ruled in favor of the Hatfields by the testimony of Bill Staton, a relative of both families. In June 1880, Staton was killed by two McCoy brothers, Sam and Paris, who were later acquitted on the grounds of self-defense.

The feud escalated after Roseanna McCoy entered a relationship with Devil Anse's son Johnson, known as "Johnse" (spelled "Jonce" in some sources), leaving her family to live with the Hatfields in West Virginia. Roseanna eventually returned to the McCoys, but when the couple tried to resume their relationship, Johnse was arrested by the McCoys on outstanding Kentucky bootlegging warrants. He was freed from McCoy custody only when Roseanna made a desperate midnight ride to alert Anse, who organized a rescue party. The Hatfield party surrounded the McCoys and took Johnse back to West Virginia before he could be transported the next day to the county seat in Pikeville, Kentucky. Despite what was seen as her betrayal of her own family on his behalf, Johnse thereafter abandoned the pregnant Roseanna for her cousin, Nancy McCoy, whom he wed in 1881.

The feud continued in 1882 when Ellison Hatfield, brother of Anse, was killed by three of Roseanna's younger brothers: Tolbert, Phamer (Pharmer), and Bud. On an election day in Kentucky, the three McCoy brothers fought a drunken Ellison and another Hatfield brother; Ellison was stabbed 26 times and finished off with a gunshot. The McCoy brothers were initially arrested by Hatfield constables and were taken to Pikeville for trial. Secretly, Anse organized a large group of vigilantes and intercepted the constables and their McCoy prisoners before they reached Pikeville. The brothers were taken by force to West Virginia. When Ellison died from his injuries, all three McCoy brothers were killed by the Hatfields in turn: they were tied to pawpaw bushes and each was shot numerous times, with a total of fifty shots fired. Their bodies were described as "bullet-riddled". Soon, another McCoy, the second son of the murdered Harmon named Larkin "Lark" McCoy, was ambushed by an alleged West Virginia posse led by the Hatfields.

Even though the Hatfields and most inhabitants of the area believed their revenge was warranted, up to about twenty men, including Anse, were indicted. All of the Hatfields eluded arrest; this angered the McCoy family, who took their cause up with Perry Cline. Cline, who was married to Martha McCoy, is believed to have used his political connections to reinstate the charges and announced rewards for the Hatfields' arrests as an act of revenge. A few years prior, Cline had lost a lawsuit against Anse over the deed to thousands of acres of land, subsequently increasing the hatred between the two families. In 1886, Jeff McCoy killed a mail carrier named Fred Wolford, and the man who went to pursue him for his crime was acting constable Cap Hatfield. Cap and a friend named Tom Wallace shot him while on the run on the banks of the Tug Fork. Tom Wallace was soon found dead in the spring of 1887.

New Year Massacre
The feud reached its peak during the 1888 New Year's Night Massacre. Cap and Vance led several members of the Hatfield clan to surround the McCoy cabin and opened fire on the sleeping family. Awoken by the shooting, the McCoys managed to grab their weapons and fired back. The cabin was then set on fire in an effort to drive the McCoys into the open. 

Panicking, the McCoys rushed to every exit they could find. Randolph managed to escape and hide inside the pig pen. Most of his children managed to escape into the woods. Unfortunately, two of Randolph's children, Calvin and Alifair, were shot and killed near the family well as they exited their home. Randolph's wife, Sarah, was caught, beaten, and almost killed. With his house burning, Randolph and his remaining family members were able to escape farther into the wilderness; his children, unprepared for the elements, suffered frostbite. The remaining McCoys moved to Pikeville to escape the West Virginia raiding parties.

Battle of the Grapevine Creek

Between 1880 and 1891, the feud claimed more than a dozen members of the two families. On one occasion, the governors of West Virginia and Kentucky even threatened to have their militias invade each other's states. In response, Kentucky Governor S. B. Buckner sent his Adjutant General Sam Hill to Pike County to investigate the situation.

A few days after the New Year's Massacre, a posse led by Pike County Deputy Sheriff Frank Philipps rode out to track down Anse's group across the state line into West Virginia. Two McCoys were members of Philipps' posse, Bud and one of Randolph's sons, James "Jim" McCoy. The posse's first victim was Vance, who was killed in the woods after he refused to be arrested. Philipps then made other successive raids on Hatfield homes and supporters, capturing many and killing another three Hatfield supporters, before cornering the rest in Grapevine Creek on January 19. Unfortunately for Philipps, Anse and other Hatfields were waiting for them with an armed group of their own. A battle ensued between the two parties, and the Hatfields were eventually apprehended. A deputy, Bill Dempsey, was wounded and executed by Frank Philipps after they surrendered. On August 24, 1888, eight of the Hatfields and their friends were indicted for the murder of Randolph's young daughter, Alfair McCoy (sometimes spelled Allaphare), who was killed during the New Year's Massacre. They included Cap, Johnse, Robert and Elliot Hatfield, Ellison Mounts, French Ellis, Charles Gillespie, and Thomas Chambers.

Trial
Because of issues of due process and illegal extradition, the United States Supreme Court became involved (Mahon v. Justice, 127 U.S. 700 (1888)). The Supreme Court ruled 7–2 in favor of Kentucky, holding that, even if a fugitive is returned from the asylum state illegally instead of through lawful extradition procedure, no federal law prevents him from being tried. Eventually, the men were tried in Kentucky and all were found guilty. Seven received life imprisonment, while the eighth, Ellison "Cottontop" Mounts, was executed by hanging and buried in an unmarked grave within sight of the gallows. 

Ellison had tried to retract his confession, stating that he was innocent and that he had only confessed because he expected leniency, but his retraction was denied. Thousands attended his hanging in Pikeville, but though the scaffold was in the open, its base was fenced in to comply with laws that had been passed which prohibited public executions. The hanging site is the current location of a classroom building of the present-day University of Pikeville. With his last words, Ellison claimed that: "The Hatfields made me do it." No one had been sent to the gallows in Pike County for forty years, and after Ellison, no one ever was again. 

Of those sent to prison:
 Valentine "Uncle Wall" Hatfield, elder brother of Anse, was overshadowed by Anse's ambitions but was one of the eight convicted, dying in prison of unknown causes. He had petitioned his brothers to assist in his emancipation from jail, but none came for fear of being captured and brought to trial. He was buried in the prison cemetery, which has since been paved over.
 Doc D. Mahon, son-in-law of Valentine and brother of Pliant, one of the eight Hatfields convicted, served 14 years in prison before returning home to live with his son, Melvin.
 Pliant Mahon, son-in-law of Valentine, served fourteen years in prison before returning home to rejoin his ex-wife, who had remarried but left her second husband to live with Pliant again.

Fighting between the families eased following the hanging of Mounts. Trials continued for years until the 1901 trial of Johnse, who was sentenced to life imprisonment for his involvement in the New Year's Massacre in the last of the feud trials.

In the modern era
In 1979, the families united for a special week's taping of the popular game show Family Feud, in which they played for a cash prize and a pig which was kept on stage during the games. The McCoy family won the week-long series three games to two. While the Hatfield family won more money – $11,272 to the McCoys' $8,459—the decision was made to augment the McCoy family's winnings to $11,273.

Tourists travel to those parts of West Virginia and Kentucky each year to examine the relics that remain from the days of the feud. In 1999, a large project known as the "Hatfield and McCoy Historic Site Restoration" was completed, funded by a federal grant from the Small Business Administration. Many improvements to various feud sites were completed. A committee of local historians spent months researching reams of information to find out about the factual history of the events surrounding the feud. This research was compiled in an audio compact disc, the Hatfield–McCoy Feud Driving Tour, which is only available at the Pike County Tourism CVB Visitors Center in Pikeville. The CD is a self-guided driving tour of the restored feud sites and includes maps and pictures as well as the audio CD. The driving tour leads visitors to feud related points of interest including the gravesites of the feudists, the "Hog Trial Cabin", also known as Valentine Hatfield's cabin, Randolph McCoy's homeplace and well in Hardy, Kentucky, Aunt Betty's House and many more sites, some complete with historical markers.

Great-great-great-grandsons Bo McCoy and Ron McCoy of feud patriarch Randolph McCoy organized a joint family reunion of the Hatfield and McCoy families in 2000 that garnered national attention. More than 5,000 people attended.

In 2002, Bo and Ron McCoy brought a lawsuit to acquire access to the McCoy Cemetery which holds the graves of six family members, including five slain during the feud. The McCoys took on a private property owner, John Vance, who had restricted access to the cemetery.

In the 2000s, a  all-terrain vehicle trail system, the Hatfield–McCoy Trails, was created around the theme of the feud.

On June 14, 2003, in Pikeville, Kentucky, the McCoy cousins partnered with Reo Hatfield of Waynesboro, Virginia, to declare an official truce between the families. Reo Hatfield said that he wanted to show that if the two families could reach an accord, others could also. He had said that he wanted to send a broader message to the world that when national security is at risk, Americans put their differences aside and stand united: "We're not saying you don't have to fight because sometimes you do have to fight," he said. "But you don't have to fight forever." Signed by more than sixty descendants during the fourth Hatfield–McCoy Festival, the truce was touted as a proclamation of peace, saying "We ask by God's grace and love that we be forever remembered as those that bound together the hearts of two families to form a family of freedom in America." Governor Paul E. Patton of Kentucky and Governor Bob Wise of West Virginia signed proclamations declaring June 14 Hatfield and McCoy Reconciliation Day. Ron McCoy, one of the festival's founders, said it is unknown where the three signed proclamations will be exhibited and that "the Hatfields and McCoys symbolize violence and feuding and fighting, but by signing this, hopefully people will realize that's not the final chapter."

The Hatfield and McCoy Reunion Festival and Marathon are held annually in June on a three-day weekend. The events take place in Pikeville, Kentucky, Matewan, West Virginia, and Williamson, West Virginia. The festival commemorates the famed feud and includes a marathon and half-marathon (the motto is "no feudin', just runnin'"), in addition to an ATV ride in all three towns. There is also a tug-of-war across the Tug Fork tributary near which the feuding families lived, a live re-enactment of scenes from their most famous fight, a motorcycle ride, live entertainment, Hatfield–McCoy landmark tours, a cornbread contest, pancake breakfast, arts, crafts, and dancing. Launched in 2000, the festival typically attracts thousands with more than 300 runners taking part in the races.

In August 2015 members of both families helped archeologists dig for ruins at a site where they believe Randolph McCoy's house was burned.

In September 2018, a wooden statue, standing over 8 feet tall, was erected in honor of Randolph McCoy at the McCoy homeplace in Hardy, Kentucky. Carved by chainsaw carver Travis Williams and donated to the property, this statue had been commissioned by McCoy property owner and Hatfield descendant Bob Scott. The statue was unveiled during Hatfield-McCoy Heritage Days in Pike County, Kentucky, an event that occurs every September that brings Hatfield and McCoy descendants back to Pike County to celebrate the long-standing peace between the families. The McCoy homeplace, like many others associated with the feud, is open to tourists year-round.

Media

Film
The 1923 Buster Keaton comedy Our Hospitality centers on the "Canfield–McKay feud," a thinly disguised fictional version of the Hatfield–McCoy feud.

The 1938 Merrie Melodies cartoon A Feud There Was depicts a feud between two backwoods families, called the Weavers and the McCoys. It features Egghead as a peace activist - going by the name Elmer Fudd (before he was a hunter) - trying to put an end to the two feuding hillbilly clans.

The 1939 Max Fleischer cartoon Musical Mountaineers has Betty Boop wander into the territory of the Peters family who are at war with the Hatfields.

The 1943 Walter Lantz Swing Symphony cartoon Pass the Biscuits Mirandy! depicts the feud between the Foys and Bartons, basing off from the lyrics of a song of the same title.

The 1946 Disney cartoon short The Martins and the Coys in Make Mine Music animated feature was another very thinly disguised caricature of the Hatfield–McCoy feud.

In 1949, the Samuel Goldwyn feature film Roseanna McCoy told a fictionalized version of the romance between the title character, played by Joan Evans, and Johnse Hatfield, played by Farley Granger.

The 1949 Screen Songs short "Comin' Round the Mountain" features another thinly disguised caricature of the Hatfield–McCoy feud, with cats (called "Catfields") and dogs ("McHounds") fighting each other, until a new school teacher arrives.

In 1950, Warner Bros. released a spoof of the Hatfield–McCoy feud titled Hillbilly Hare, featuring Bugs Bunny interacting with members of the "Martin family", obviously a reference to a family in the other famous Kentucky feud, the Rowan County War who had been feuding with the "Coy family". When Bugs Bunny is asked, "Be y'all a Martin or be y'all a Coy rabbit?", Bugs answers, "Well, my friends say I'm very coy!" and laughs. The Martin brothers chase Bugs for the rest of the short and are outwitted by him at every turn.

The 1951 Abbott and Costello feature Comin' Round the Mountain features a feud between the Winfields and McCoys.

The 2007 movie Pumpkinhead: Blood Feud portrays the feud between the Hatfields and McCoys, but the circumstances of the feud are different.

In 2012, Lionsgate Films released a direct-to-DVD film titled Hatfields & McCoys: Bad Blood, starring Jeff Fahey, Perry King, and Christian Slater. This was another thinly-disguised fictional version of the conflict.

Literature
Members of the Hatfield clan appear in Manly Wade Wellman's 1957 short story Old Devlins Was A-Waiting alongside fictional great-grandchildren of both the Hatfields and McCoys.

The Lucky Luke adventure Les Rivaux de Painful Gulch (The Rivals of Painful Gulch) from 1962 was inspired by the Hatfield–McCoy feud.

Ann Rinaldi authored a 2002 historical novel titled The Coffin Quilt, based on a fictionalized account of the feud.

In Kurt Vonnegut's 1976 novel Slapstick, a frontiersman dressed like "Davy Crockett" kills a man charged with conveying a message to the former of the United States because he mistakes him for Newton McCoy. When the frontiersman is asked his name, he replies "Byron Hatfield".

In Mark Twain's 1884 novel Adventures of Huckleberry Finn, the Grangerfords, an aristocratic Kentuckian family headed by the sexagenarian Colonel Saul Grangerford, take Huck in after he is separated from Jim on the Mississippi. Huck becomes close friends with the youngest male of the family, Buck Grangerford, who is Huck's age. By the time Huck meets them, the Grangerfords have been engaged in an age-old blood feud with another local family, the Shepherdsons. He also becomes the unwitting correspondent between two young lovers among the families, an elopement which leads to a battle between the two families and the loss of several lives on both sides.

Television
The Flintstones featured a feud between the Hatrocks and the Flintstones in the episode "The Flintstone Hillbillies" (aired January 16, 1964), which was loosely based upon the Hatfield–McCoy feud.

The Ghost of Witch McCoy appears as the main villain in The Scooby-Doo Show episode “The Ozark Witch Switch.” A fictional member of the McCoy family hanged for witchcraft, she exacts her vengeance by turning Hatfields into frogs.

The 1960 episode of "The Andy Griffith Show" titled "A Feud is a Feud" has a Wakefield and a Carter trying to prevent Andy, in his role as Justice of the Peace, from marrying two young lovers on opposite sides of the feud.  Andy calls the two feuding fathers to a duel when he finds out that "not nary a shot had ever been fired during this feud".  Both prove to be cowards in comparison with their courageous children, and the feuding fathers order Andy, at gunpoint: "Sheriff, get to marryin'!"

The 1968 Merrie Melodies cartoon "Feud with a Dude" has the character Merlin the Magic Mouse trying to make peace with the two families, only to end up as the new target. This short has Hatfield claiming McCoy stole his hen, while McCoy claims Hatfield stole his pig.

A 1975 television movie titled The Hatfields and the McCoys told a fictionalized version of the story. It starred Jack Palance as "Devil Anse" Hatfield and Steve Forrest as "Randall" McCoy.

An episode of the Cartoon Network time travel animated series Time Squad, titled 'Feud For Thought' (aired October 26, 2001), features the Time Squad going back to the time of the Hatfields and the McCoys, where they find that the McCoys are being peaceful rather than fighting. This poses a threat to established history, leading the titular team to try and restore the feud.

A fifth-season episode of The West Wing has the Communications Director describe the feud between Israelis and Palestinians as "Hatfield and McCoy".

The two feuding Virginia families in the 2007 made-for-TV film Pumpkinhead: Blood Feud are called Hatfield and McCoy.

The second-season episode Vanished of NCIS takes place in a rural valley in Virginia, the two sides of which are feuding in a manner that Leroy Jethro Gibbs compares to the Hatfields and McCoys.

The eleventh episode of Bones season 7, entitled The Family in the Feud, is about a long-running family feud that main character Seeley Booth likens to the Hatfield–McCoy feud.

From May 28–30, 2012, U.S. television network The History Channel aired a three-part miniseries titled Hatfields & McCoys, starring Kevin Costner as William Anderson "Devil Anse" Hatfield and co-starring Bill Paxton as Randolph "Ole Ran'l" McCoy, Tom Berenger as Jim Vance, and Powers Boothe as Judge Valentine "Wall" Hatfield. The miniseries set the record as the most-watched entertainment telecast in the history of advertising-supported basic cable.

A pair of rifles owned by the Hatfields and the McCoys appeared as a pair of artifacts in the fourth season of the Syfy original show Warehouse 13. Within the show, the rifles have the ability to attract each other like magnets but open fire when they get close enough to each other.

In 2013, NBC commissioned a pilot for a television show updating the feud to present-day Pittsburgh with Rebecca De Mornay, Virginia Madsen, Sophia Bush, and James Remar but it was not picked up.

On August 1, 2013, the reality television series Hatfields & McCoys: White Lightning premiered on the History channel. The series begins with an investor offering to set up the feuding families into business making moonshine, and follows the families' attempt to run the business together.

In an episode of Modern Family originally aired January 15, 2014, titled "Under Pressure," Cam is working as a gym teacher who has plans to let parents play dodgeball with each other at the school's open house, and wants to divide the two teams into Hatfields and McCoys. The school principal frowns upon this idea, however, Gloria and a competitive mother played by Jane Krakowski decide to settle their score with such a game. Hurriedly Cam proclaims Hatfields for one side and McCoys for the other.

The fifth season of My Little Pony: Friendship Is Magic featured an episode titled "The Hooffields and McColts", in which two clans have a longstanding feud over whether to use land for farming or construction. A similar theme was covered in Season 3, episode 9 of Littlest Pet Shop, "Feud for Thought", in which two koalas are at odds with each other but don't know why, other than that their owners are in a feud.

In the Bonanza episode "The Gunmen" (season 1, episode 19) Joe and Hoss were mistaken for two gunmen called Sladeboys that were hired by Mcfadden (McCoy) to take out the Hatfields in the small Texas town of Kiowa Flats.

In the Ben 10 reboot, a season 3 episode called "Them's Fighting Words!" features a parody of the feud, where the Hartfields and McJoys have been trying to claim ownership over a missing corn flute, accusing the other family of stealing it. The villain Hex actually finds it and starts summoning in the family's ancestors, finding out the flute's power increases the more the two families fight each other, though Ben and Gwen are able to quell them and stop Hex's plans to create an army of ghost soldiers by revealing that it was meant to be shared by them as a marriage gift, ending the feud.

WGBH Boston's Public Broadcasting Service (PBS) American Experience episode "The Feud" (season 32, episode 1) originally aired on September 10, 2019, documenting the Hatfield-McCoy family feud 1863-1891.

Music

The song "The Hatfield and the McCoy's" was written and sung by Eddie Martin, a Bristol-based musician and regular at the Famous Old Duke. It is track 8 on Pillowcase Blues.

In 2018, Mountain Fever Records released a single from their album from Dave Adkins, Right Or Wrong. The song, "Blood Feud", written by Dave Adkins and Larry Cordle, is a retelling of the familiar story of the deadly discord between the Hatfield and McCoy families during the Civil War era.

Ice Cube’s 1991 song “My Summer Vacation” includes a reference “Feudin', like the Hatfields and McCoys”

In the song “Black Cowboys” from Jeru the Damaja's 1996 album "Wrath of the Math", he includes a reference “We shoot sh*t up like the Hatfields and McCoys”.

Waylon Jennings' 1977 song "Luckenbach Texas (Back To The Basics Of Love)" includes the reference "... this successful life we're livin', got us feudin' like the Hatfields and McCoys"

Theater

A dinner show based on the rivalry is performed year round in Pigeon Forge, Tennessee since 2010.

Hatfield genealogy

Devil Anse Hatfield family tree
Names in red indicate those who were killed as a direct result of the feud.Names in orange highlight intermarriages between Hatfield and McCoy.

McCoy genealogy

Randolph McCoy family tree
Names in red indicate those who were killed as a direct result of the feud.Names in orange highlight intermarriages between Hatfield and McCoy.

See also
 Jones–Liddell feud
 List of feuds in the United States
 Narcissism of small differences

References

Bibliography

Further reading

External links
 Listen online – The Story of the Hatfields and McCoys – The American Storyteller Radio Journal
 Hatfield–McCoy Feud  West Virginia Archives and History
 Hatfield-McCoy Photographs West Virginia Archives and History
 
  (1975)
  (2012)

Appalachian culture in Kentucky
Deaths by firearm in Kentucky
Feuds in the United States
 
History of Kentucky
History of West Virginia
Internal wars of the United States
West Virginia culture
Pike County, Kentucky